Marburg (Lahn) station is a through station at the 104.3 km mark of the Main-Weser Railway in the north-east of the city of Marburg in the German state of Hesse and is used daily by about 12,000 people. The station is classified by Deutsche Bahn (DB) as a category 3 station.

History
The station was completed with the construction of the Main-Weser Railway in 1850 and was built outside the built up area of the city on the other side of the Lahn.

In 1903, the station became the terminus of the Marburg Tramways (Straßenbahn Marburg). Initially, this was a horse-hauled system, which was converted to electric operations in 1911. After the Second World War, it was decided to close the tramway in 1951. A short time later the Marburg trolleybus network was opened to replace the tramways. This was finally closed in 1968.

Entrance building
The entrance building and the rest of the station buildings are now mostly listed as a monument under the Hessian Heritage Act.

The first station building was designed by Julius Eugen Ruhl. In 1907 it was replaced during an expansion of the station with an entrance building designed by the architect Alois Holtmeyer. The station building was severely damaged in the Second World War and its Baroque Revival exterior form was largely restored after the war.

In 2004, the station was equipped with digital information displays on the platforms and in the entrance building and was declared to be a smoke-free station. The station building is still rundown.

In the eastern area of the station is the former—now abandoned—operations depot. These include several in brick buildings built in 1890, including a roundhouse. The former wagon hall is now used as a cultural centre.

Infrastructure
Marburg station is managed by DB Station&Service and classified as a category 3 station. Normally stations of this category offer service into the evening, but DB provides no customer service in the evening in order to save costs. The station is served by many regional and city bus routes.

East of the passenger station is the disused freight yard, which consisted of a small marshalling yard (with a hump and four short sidings), and north of it are disused loading tracks.

The station has six platform tracks. The continuing services on the Main-Weser Railways stop at platforms 4 and 5 and the terminating traffic on the Burgwald Railway from Marburg to Frankenberg (Eder) and the Upper Lahn Valley Railway from Erndtebrück stop on tracks 1, 2 and 8. Track 1a is used exclusively by trains to and from Gießen that start or end at Marburg.

Operations

Long-distance services
Already in the 1980s and 1990s were Intercity services that stopped once a day in Marburg. In 2002, InterRegio services on the Main-Weser Railway were reclassified as intercity services. Since then, Marburg has been on the Intercity network on the route between Karlsruhe and Hamburg, some extended to Stralsund. These services have been operated as Intercity-Express services since 2018. The station is served at 2-hour intervals. On Sundays there is also one Intercity train pair between Berlin Südkreuz and Westerland.

Regional services
The station is served on the Main-Weser Railway by the Main-Weser-Express service (Regional-Express 30) on the Frankfurt–Kassel route and the Mittelhessen-Express (RB 41). The station is the terminus for the Upper Lahn Valley Railway and the Burgwald Railway, both branching off the Main-Weser Railway in Cölbe. In addition, a few Regionalbahn services to/from Gießen and individual Regional-Express services from Frankfurt also start or terminate in Marburg. The trains on the closed Aar-Salzböde Railway sometimes ran to Marburg, but usually they ended at the junction station of Niederwalgern. Since December 2010, the Main-Sieg-Express has operated from Marburg to Frankfurt.

Reorganisation of the station and planning

The current state of the station is criticised. Although Marburg is a centre for the education of visually impaired people, the station does not have appropriate instructions in Braille. It is not classified as accessible by the disabled as it does not have conducting strips for the visually impaired and does not have barrier-free access to the central platforms.

Currently, a redesign of the entrance building, the platforms and station environment is underway at a total estimated cost of €11 million. Among other things, through traffic will be removed from the station forecourt and the traffic between central Marburg and Neue Kasseler Straße will no longer run directly in front of the station, but will instead use Ernst-Giller-Straße. Service facilities will be installed in the upper floors of the station. Reconstruction of the entrance building started on 3 December 2009 and was completed in late 2011. In October 2010, ground was broken for the work in the station forecourt. The entire project is expected to be completed in 2014.

In addition, a new Marburg Mitte station is planned closer to central Marburg (near the University Library) that will relieve the city traffic and make the use of rail more attractive for commuting.

References

External links
 Marburg (Lahn) station at www.bahnhof.de

Railway stations in Hesse
Railway stations in Germany opened in 1850
Railway station